Pink Dream is a 1932 Chinese silent film and an early film by director Cai Chusheng. A melodrama, the film's pointed critique of the decadent urban lifestyle was nevertheless met with criticism by Shanghai's progressives, who regarded the film itself as decadent and excessively influenced by American cinema, particularly the film's numerous scenes of Shanghai's dance halls. Today the film is generally regarded as Cai's last film before his turn towards more overtly leftist films.

It is sometimes translated as A Dream in Pink. An extant print of the film is maintained by the China Film Archives.

Plot 
Pink Dream tells the story of a young novelist who is supported by a loving and hard-working wife. The novelist, however, is drawn to the decadent life of a socialite who introduces him to the dance halls that dot Shanghai. As the film progresses, the novelist soon learns of the emptiness of this urban existence and rejects it as a "pink dream."

Notes

References 
 Zhang, Zhen. An Amorous History of the Silver Screen: Shanghai Cinema, 1896-1937. University of Chicago Press (2005). .

External links 
 
 Pink Dream at the Chinese Movie Database

1932 films
1932 drama films
Films directed by Cai Chusheng
Films set in Shanghai
Lianhua Film Company films
Chinese silent films
Chinese black-and-white films
Chinese drama films
Melodrama films
Silent drama films